Rogier Krohne (born 23 November 1986) is a Dutch former professional footballer who played as a striker.

Career
Krohne began his career with FC Groningen, and made his debut as a substitute for Glen Salmon in a 2–1 defeat against RKC Waalwijk in the Eredivisie August 2005. He made a further three appearances over the following three years, but could not break into a strongly performing Groningen side, and left for FC Emmen of the Eerste Divisie in July 2008. He made eighteen appearances for Emmen in the 2008–09 season, all but one as a substitute, without getting on the scoresheet, before leaving at the end of the season.

Krohne then moved to Germany to sign for BV Cloppenburg of the fifth-tier Oberliga Niedersachsen-West. He scored 22 goals in the 2009–10 season as Cloppenburg finished 4th, then 25 the following year as they finished 2nd in the Oberliga Niedersachsen, the two regions having been merged into one division. The following year, Krohne scored fourteen times as Cloppenburg finished second again, enough for promotion as the Regionalliga was being re-structured. Krohne ended his first season in the Regionalliga Nord as the league's top scorer, with 24 goals as Cloppenburg finished 12th. He then signed for Preußen Münster of the 3. Liga.

In July 2017, Krohne joined VV Winsum of the Dutch sixth tier.

References

External links
 
 

1986 births
Living people
People from Tynaarlo
Dutch footballers
Association football forwards
FC Groningen players
FC Emmen players
BV Cloppenburg players
SC Preußen Münster players
FC Schalke 04 II players
3. Liga players
Regionalliga players
Dutch expatriate sportspeople in Germany
Footballers from Drenthe
Expatriate footballers in Germany
Dutch expatriate footballers